Nirai Kudam is a 1969 Indian Tamil-language film, directed by Muktha Srinivasan and produced by V. Ramasamy. The film stars Sivaji Ganesan and Vanisri. It was released on 8 August 1969.

Plot

Cast 
Sivaji Ganesan as Prabhakar/Dr.Babu
Vanisri as Chithra
R. Muthuraman as Sampath
Major Sundarrajan as Madhanagopal
V. K. Ramasamy as Appadurai
Cho as Giri
Manorama as Girija
Thengai Srinivasan as Professor
Sachu as Hema
M. Bhanumathi
Kathadi Ramamurthy as cooking master (Guest Role)
Veerasamy
G. Sakunthala as Girija's aunty

Production 
Nirai Kudam is the first film for Sivaji Ganesan with Muktha Films.

Soundtrack

References

External links 
 

1960s Tamil-language films
1969 films
Films directed by Muktha Srinivasan